Alfred "Fred" Carel van Dorp (born 13 October 1938 in Batavia, Dutch East Indies) is a former Dutch water polo player who participated in three Summer Olympics with the Dutch Men's National Team. He was given the honour to carry the national flag of the Netherlands at the opening and closing ceremonies of the 1968 Summer Olympics in Mexico City, becoming the eleventh water polo player to be a flag bearer at the opening and closing ceremonies of the Olympics. After retiring he worked for many years as a water polo referee.

His elder brother, Tony van Dorp, was also a water polo player, who participated in the 1964 and 1968 Olympics for the United States, and played against his brother.

International senior tournaments
 1960 – Summer Olympics (Rome, 8th position)
 1964 – Summer Olympics (Tokyo, 8th position)
 1968 – Summer Olympics (Mexico City, 7th position)

See also
 Netherlands men's Olympic water polo team records and statistics
 List of flag bearers for the Netherlands at the Olympics

References

External links

 

1938 births
Living people
Dutch male water polo players
Dutch water polo officials
Olympic water polo players of the Netherlands
Water polo players at the 1960 Summer Olympics
Water polo players at the 1964 Summer Olympics
Water polo players at the 1968 Summer Olympics
People from Batavia, Dutch East Indies